Alojz Fricelj (born 9 October 1963) is a retired Slovenian football midfielder.

References

1963 births
Living people
Slovenian footballers
NK Maribor players
Association football midfielders
Slovenian expatriate footballers
Expatriate footballers in Austria
Slovenian expatriate sportspeople in Austria